Samuel Kicis (1913 – 1984), was a Brazilian Army general and a veteran of World War II. He was born in Rio de Janeiro, the child of Jewish immigrants from Romania.  He joined the Brazilian Army as a cadet-officer in 1932.   He served as an Artillery captain, in the Brazilian Expeditionary Force in Italy and was mentioned in dispatches.  He was the recipient of many Brazilian honours including the  “Cruz de Combate de 2a. Classe”, the “Medalha de Campanha”, the “Medalha de Guerra” and the “Medalha do Pacificador”. General Kicis retired from the Army after a distinguished career in 1968.

Brazilian Jews
Brazilian people of Romanian-Jewish descent
1913 births
1984 deaths
Brazilian military personnel of World War II
Brazilian generals
People from Rio de Janeiro (city)